Mark Paul Corneille (born 31 May 1986) is an English football player, who last played as a defender for Margate.

He began his career with Gillingham, and made his professional debut against Colchester United on 6 August 2005. At the end of the 2005–06 season he was released by the club and joined Bromley. Corneille made over 150 appearances for the "Ravens", before joining Maidstone United in March 2010 where he stayed until he departed the club in the summer of 2010.

Corneille spent the 2010–11 season out of the game due to work commitments, before signing a two-year contract with Margate on 26 July 2011.

References

External links

Profile on Bromley F.C. website

1986 births
Living people
English footballers
Gillingham F.C. players
Bromley F.C. players
Maidstone United F.C. players
Margate F.C. players
Eastbourne Borough F.C. players
English Football League players
Association football defenders